The ladies' individual skating event was held as part of the figure skating at the 1948 Winter Olympics. It was the seventh appearance of the event, which had previously been held twice at the Summer Olympics in 1908 and 1920 and at all four Winter Games from 1924 onward. The competition was held from 3 to 6 February 1948. Twenty-five figure skaters from ten nations competed.

Results

Referee:
  Gustavus F.C. Witt

Assistant Referee:
  Jakob Biedermann

Judges:
  Ercole Cattaneo
  Harold G. Storke
  Eugen Kirchhofer
  Hubert M. Martineau
  Melville F. Rogers
  Adolf Rosdol
  Georges Torchon
  Marcell Vadas
  Karel Zemek
  Christen Christensen (substitute)

References

Figure skating at the 1948 Winter Olympics
1948 in figure skating